Herman Joseph Weiss (February 19, 1856 – March 19, 1926) was a Prussian-born American brewmaster.  He immigrated to Texas in the 1880s with his wife Maria. 

According to the 1900 census Herman Weiss was living in San Antonio and working as a saloon keeper. His eldest son, Herman Weiss Jr, is listed with the family at the age of 18 and is working as a brewer at the Lone Star Brewery.  

From 1907-1909 he lived in Galveston where he owned and operated the Herman J. Weiss & Sons Brewery.  Both of his eldest sons, Herman Weiss Jr and Charles Weiss worked at the brewery with their father.

In the summer of 1909 Herman Weiss Sr was offered the position of head brewmaster at the newly formed Shiner Brewery which later became the Spoetzl Brewery.  According to the 1910 census, Charles Weiss lived in Shiner, Texas and worked at the brewery as well.  Photographic evidence suggest that Herman Jr worked at the Shiner Brewery as well in 1909.  Herman Weiss Jr and his family are shown to be residing in Houston in the 1910 census.  The Shiner Brewery had early success, but may have suffered refrigeration issues.   Newspaper articles from the Shiner Gazette in the summer of 1910 report that a refrigeration system was installed at the brewery.  There is no mention of spoilage found in the Shiner Gazette from that time period.   In October of 1910 the Shiner Gazette reported that a new brewmaster, Mr. Hollenburg, had been hired and the Herman Weiss Sr and Charles Weiss had departed with their families for Houston.

Herman Weiss Sr was later employed in San Antonio as a brewmaster for the San Antonio Brewing Association which later became the Pearl Brewing Company.  He also ran a saloon out of his residence at 400 S. Flores St.

Images

References

Back copies of the Shiner Gazette accessed at the county library in Halletsville, TX. and online at Newspapers.com

External links 

Shiner Unofficial History
Galveston Breweries
San Antonio Brewing Association(Pearl)
Find-a-Grave

German emigrants to the United States
Brewery workers
1856 births
1926 deaths